Paulo Roberto Bacinello (born 29 September 1959), commonly known as Paulinho Cascavel, is a Brazilian retired footballer who played as a striker.

He spent most of his professional career in Portugal, primarily with Vitória de Guimarães and Sporting CP.

Club career
Born in Cascavel, Paraná, Cascavel (whose nickname stemmed from his birthplace) started his career with local amateurs Cascavel Clube Recreativo, then played for Criciúma Esporte Clube, Joinville Esporte Clube and Fluminense FC. He made five appearances in the 1983 edition of the Campeonato Brasileiro Série B with Criciúma, and was top scorer of the following year's Campeonato Catarinense with 27 goals while with Joinville. 

Cascavel moved to Portugal in December 1984, signing with Primeira Liga club FC Porto, but only played one game there. In the following season he joined Guimarães' Vitória SC, and scored 22 times in his second year – top scorer in the competition – as the Minho side finished in third place, and qualified for the UEFA Cup.

Cascavel was acquired by Sporting CP for 1987–88 and scored 24 goals during that campaign, but the Lisbon-based team finished fourth. He added six in as many matches in their quarter-final run in the UEFA Cup Winners' Cup.

Cascavel's numbers reduced significantly the following years, and he retired in June 1991 while still in Portugal with Gil Vicente FC.

Personal life
Cascavel's son, Guilherme, also nicknamed Cascavel, was also a footballer and a striker. Born in Portugal, he too played mostly in the country, mainly in its Segunda Liga.

Honours

Club
Joinville
Campeonato Catarinense: 1984

Fluminense
Campeonato Carioca: 1984

Porto
Primeira Liga: 1984–85

Sporting CP
Supertaça Cândido de Oliveira: 1987

Individual
Primeira Liga top scorer: 1986–87, 1987–88

References

External links

1959 births
Living people
People from Cascavel
Sportspeople from Paraná (state)
Brazilian footballers
Association football forwards
Campeonato Brasileiro Série B players
Criciúma Esporte Clube players
Joinville Esporte Clube players
Fluminense FC players
Primeira Liga players
FC Porto players
Vitória S.C. players
Sporting CP footballers
Gil Vicente F.C. players
Brazilian expatriate footballers
Expatriate footballers in Portugal
Brazilian expatriate sportspeople in Portugal